Bulbophyllum curvicaule is a species of orchid in the genus Bulbophyllum. It is commonly referred to as "The Curved Column Bulbophyllum.

References

curvicaule